Dramdal is a small village in Viken, Norway.

Dramdal is located in  Øvre Eiker municipality. It is situated on the eastern bank of Drammenselva, opposite the village of Skotselv  on the other side of the river. Norwegian National Road Riksvei 35 passes through the village.

References

Villages in Buskerud